Jean-Michel Ferrand (born 31 August 1942 in Gardanne, Bouches-du-Rhône) was a member of the National Assembly of France.  He represented the Vaucluse department,  and is a member of the Union for a Popular Movement. He lost his seat in the run-off of the parliamentary elections of 17 June 2012 against Marion Maréchal-Le Pen. Jean-Michel Ferrand is well known for his gaudy appearance and meridional loquacity.

Points of view
He is a member of the Popular Right.
He is a partisan of the death penalty for terrorism.

References

1942 births
Living people
People from Bouches-du-Rhône
Rally for the Republic politicians
Union for a Popular Movement politicians
The Popular Right
Deputies of the 12th National Assembly of the French Fifth Republic
Deputies of the 13th National Assembly of the French Fifth Republic